Mathias Peter Greve Petersen (born 11 February 1995) is a Danish footballer who plays as a midfielder for Brøndby IF in the Danish Superliga.

Club career

OB
Greve came to OB at the age of 11, from Langeskov IF. At the age of 19, Greve was promoted to the first-team squad in the summer 2014 and also signed a professional contract with OB in April 2014. He made his professional debut on 25 July 2014. Greve started on the bench, but replaced Darko Bodul in the 78nd minut in a 1–3 defeat against FC Vestsjælland in the Danish Superliga. Greve scored his first goal for OB on 31 May 2015 in the 79th minute of a 2–2 draw against Hobro IK in the domestic league.

On 1 November 2015, Greve signed a four-year contract extension keeping him in Odense until 2019.

Randers
On 27 January 2020, 24-year-old Greve joined Randers on a three-year contract and received shirt number 22. He only made his debut on 28 May in a 1–1 away draw against rivals AGF, as the league had been suspended for some months due to effects of the COVID-19 pandemic. He scored his first goal on 16 June in a 4–0 win over Hobro after an assist by Simon Piesinger.

Brøndby
After a strong start to the 2021–22 season with two assist and one goal in the first three games of the campaign for Randers, Greve was sold to 2020–21 Danish Superliga champions Brøndby on 4 August 2021, signing a deal until June 2025. He made his debut against rivals Copenhagen on 8 August in a 2–4 away loss.

Honours
Randers
Danish Cup: 2020–21

References

External links
 
 Mathias Greve on DBU

Living people
1995 births
Association football midfielders
Danish men's footballers
Danish Superliga players
Odense Boldklub players
Randers FC players
Brøndby IF players
Denmark youth international footballers
People from Kerteminde Municipality
Sportspeople from the Region of Southern Denmark